Erica margaritacea, the pearl heath, is a species of Erica that was naturally restricted to the city of Cape Town.

Historically, this Erica grew naturally in the Cape Flats Sand Fynbos of the Southern Suburbs, Cape Town. However, urban development caused it to go extinct in the wild. Specimens that were preserved by Botanists were used to reintroduce this species to the last remaining patch of its habitat, the Kenilworth Racecourse Conservation Area.

It produces enormous amounts of white, pearl-shaped flowers and can readily be cultivated in urban gardens.

References

margaritacea
Endemic flora of South Africa
Flora of the Cape Provinces
Natural history of Cape Town